Michael Jason Gruttadauria (born December 6, 1972) is a former American football center in the National Football League for the St. Louis Rams and Arizona Cardinals. He played college football at the University of Central Florida.

Early years
In his younger years, his family moved between Las Vegas, South Jersey and Fort Lauderlade. He attended Tarpon Springs High School, where he began to play organized football. He initially accepted a half football scholarship from the University of Central Florida, where he became a four-year starter and is recognized as the greatest center in school history.

In 2004, he was named to the Orlando Sentinel's 25th Anniversary University of Central Florida Football Team. He also was inducted into UCF Athletics Hall of Fame.

Professional career

Dallas Cowboys
Gruttadauria was signed as an undrafted free agent by the Dallas Cowboys in 1995, after not being selected in the NFL Draft  because he was considered to be too small to play at the professional level. On August 22, he was released along with the entire practice squad when the team signed Deion Sanders and the Cowboys didn't have enough salary cap room to keep the players.

St. Louis Rams
In 1996, he was signed as a free agent by the St. Louis Rams after being out of football for a year, and was named the starting center for the last 3 games of the season. Though he entered each year with the Rams as the starter, injuries and knee surgeries limited his starts.

He was injured through most of the 1998 season but returned strong in 1999, starting all 16 games for the Super Bowl-winning team. That year in the playoffs, with Kurt Warner at quarterback, St. Louis led the NFL with 526 points (32.9 points/game) and finished with a 13-3 won-lost mark, best in the NFC West division. In the divisional round, the Rams beat the Minnesota Vikings, amassing 374 net passing yards thanks to excellent pass protection, despite 2 sacks for 17 yards lost. Gruttadauria with guards Tom Nütten and Adam Timmerman as well as tackles Orlando Pace and Fred Miller continued to protect Warner effectively in the NFC championship game, squeezing past the excellent defense of the Tampa Bay Buccaneers 11-6. Though pitted against Warren Sapp and Brad Culpepper at defensive tackle, Gruttadauria and the rest of the line did not allow a sack and gained 258 net passing yards. In Super Bowl XXXIV, the Rams won another squeaker against the Tennessee Titans 23-16, with 407 net passing yards (1 sack for 7 yards lost) and a mere 29 rushing yards. Some of the success of that team was due to the strategy of the center occasionally snapping the ball very quickly back to Warner, catching the opposing defensive line off-guard.

Arizona Cardinals
On February 19, 2000 he signed as a free agent with the Arizona Cardinals. The next year, he was awarded the Ed Block Courage Award. Because of injuries, he played only half the year in 2000 and 2002, his final year in 2001, though he played 15 games. He was released on April 2, 2003.

References

External links
Gruttadauria UCF bio

1972 births
Living people
Players of American football from Fort Lauderdale, Florida
American football centers
UCF Knights football players
St. Louis Rams players
Arizona Cardinals players
Ed Block Courage Award recipients